Charles Edmund Boyle (February 4, 1836 – December 15, 1888) was a Democratic member of the U.S. House of Representatives from Pennsylvania.

Charles E. Boyle was born in Uniontown, Pennsylvania.  He attended the common schools, and Waynesburg College in Waynesburg, Pennsylvania.  He studied law, was admitted to the bar in December 1861 and practiced.  He was elected district attorney for Fayette County, Pennsylvania, in 1862.  He served as a member of the Pennsylvania State House of Representatives in 1865 and 1866.  He was president of the Democratic State convention in 1867 and 1871, and a delegate to the Democratic National Convention in 1876 and 1880.

Boyle was elected as a Democrat to the Forty-eighth and Forty-ninth Congresses.  He was not a candidate for renomination in 1886.  He was appointed judge of the Territory of Washington in September 1888 and served until his death in Seattle, Washington, in 1888.  Interment in Oak Grove Cemetery in Uniontown, Pennsylvania.

Sources

The Political Graveyard

1836 births
1888 deaths
Democratic Party members of the Pennsylvania House of Representatives
Pennsylvania lawyers
People of the Washington Territory
People from Uniontown, Pennsylvania
Waynesburg University alumni
Democratic Party members of the United States House of Representatives from Pennsylvania
19th-century American politicians
19th-century American lawyers